Ram Sakal Gurjar is an Indian businessman and politician from Agra district in Uttar Pradesh. He is a former Minister of State for Programme Implementation and Minister of State (Independent charge) for Sports and Youth Welfare in Samajwadi Party government (2012–17). In April 2019 he joined Bharatiya Janata Party (BJP) .
With his immense popularity in Western Uttar Pradesh he is seen as a great influential leader in whole Western UP.
Ram Sakal Gurjar is a member of the Bharatiya Janata Party, representing the Agra district of Uttar Pradesh.

References 

1975 births
Living people
Members of the Uttar Pradesh Legislative Council
Politicians from Agra
Samajwadi Party politicians from Uttar Pradesh
Bharatiya Janata Party politicians from Uttar Pradesh